Mountain Lake may refer to a location in North America:

Canada 
 Mountain Lake (Nova Scotia), in Halifax Regional Municipality
 Mountain Lake (Ontario), several lakes
 Mountain Lake (mine), a prospective uranium mine in the Northwest Territories

United States 
 Mountain Lake, Florida, a private community
 Mountain Lake (Georgia), a lake near Georgia State Route 34
 Mountain Lake (Cook County, Minnesota), a lake
 Mountain Lake, Minnesota, a city in Cottonwood County
 Mountain Lake Township, Cottonwood County, Minnesota
 Mountain Lake, New Jersey, a community
 Mountain Lake (New York), a lake in southern Adirondack Park in upstate New York
 Mountain Lake (Delaware County, New York), a lake
 Mountain Lake (Virginia), a lake where the exteriors for the 1987 movie Dirty Dancing were filmed
 Mountain Lake Park, in San Francisco

See also
 Lake Mountain (Victoria), Victoria, Australia
 Lake Mountains, Utah, United States
 Mountain Lake PBS, branding for WCFE-TV
 Mountain Lakes, New Hampshire
 Mountain Lakes, New Jersey
 Mountain Lakes station, a railway station in New Jersey